A. limosus may refer to:
 Amnicola limosus, the mud amnicola, an aquatic snail species found in the Northwest Atlantic Ocean and along the Gulf of Maine
 Atelopus limosus, the sapo limosa or limosa harlequin frog, an endangered toad species endemic to Panama

See also